The 2000 Men's Hockey Champions Trophy was the 22nd edition of the Hockey Champions Trophy men's field hockey tournament.


Squads

Head Coach: Terry Walsh

Head Coach: Paul Lissek

Head Coach: Barry Dancer

Head Coach: Maurits Hendriks

Head Coach: Kim Sang-ryul

Head Coach: Antonio Forrellat

Results

Pool

Classification

Fifth and sixth place

Third and fourth place

Final

Awards

Final standings

External links
Official FIH website

C
Champions Trophy (field hockey)
2000
C